This was a new event in the ITF Women's Circuit.

Cindy Burger and Arantxa Rus won the inaugural title, defeating Ágnes Bukta and Jesika Malečková in the final, 6–1, 6–4.

Seeds

Draw

References 
 Draw

Sport11 Ladies Open - Doubles